Caspian American Telecom LLC (CATEL) is an American Azerbaijan Mobile Telecommunications Joint venture between the Azerbaijan government and US consortium Omni Communications.

History

CATEL was the third company in Azerbaijan (after state run Azerfon and Motorola owned Bakcell) to be granted a wireless communications license.

As of 2007 the company had 22,000 subscribers. The company invested $25 Million in 30 CDMA base stations during 2007

References

External links

Communications in Azerbaijan